The pink-legged rail (Hypotaenidia insignis), also known as the New Britain rail, is a species of bird in the family Rallidae.

Distribution and habitat
It is endemic to the island of New Britain.  Its natural habitats are subtropical or tropical moist lowland forest and subtropical or tropical moist montane forest.  It is threatened by habitat loss.

References

pink-legged rail
Birds of New Britain
pink-legged rail
pink-legged rail
Taxonomy articles created by Polbot